Say a Little Prayer is an Australian children's film by Richard Lowenstein. It stars Sudi de Winter, Fiona Ruttelle, Rebecca Smart, Lynne Murphy and Jill Forster. The film was written by Richard Lowenstein, based on Robin Klein's novel, Came Back to Show You I Could Fly. It was nominated for four Australian Film Institute Awards.

Premise
Say a Little Prayer tells the story of a friendship between a lonely 11-year-old boy and a drug-addicted young lady.

Cast
 Sudi de Winter as Seymour, 11-year-old boy
 Fiona Ruttelle as Angie, 20-something
 Rebecca Smart as Lynne, Angie's younger sister
 Lynne Murphy as Thelma, Seymour's guardian
 Mickey Camilleri as Seymour's Mum
 Ben Mendelsohn as Nursery Boss
 Jill Forster as Mrs Easterbrook, Angie's Mum

Production
 Director & Screenwriter Richard Lowenstein
 Producer Carol Hughes
 Director of Photography Graeme Wood
 Editing Jill Bilcock
 Production Design Chris Kennedy
 Art Direction Hugh Bateman
 Sound Recordist Lloyd Carrick
 Costume Design  Lynn-Maree Milburn
 Music David Bridie, John Phillips

The film was funded by the 1991 Australian Film Finance Corporation's Film Fund Scheme. The production company was Flying Films and distribution was by Beyond International.

Awards
 Nomination – AFI Award – Best Actress in a Lead Role (Fiona Ruttelle)
 Nomination – AFI Award – Best Actress in a Supporting Role (Jill Forster)
 Nomination – AFI Award – Best Achievement in Production Design (Chris Kennedy)
 Nomination – AFI Award – Best Achievement in Costume Design (Lynn-Maree Milburn, Jacqui Everitt)
 Winner – Giffoni Film Festival – Best Director (Richard Lowenstein)
 Winner – Giffoni Film Festival – Best Actress (Fiona Ruttelle)

Box office
Say a Little Prayer grossed $12,500 at the box office in Australia.

See also
 Cinema of Australia

References

External links
 
 Say a Little Prayer at Oz Movies
 Pixelsurgeon Richard Lowenstein
 allmovie Say a Little Prayer overview
 Time Out Film Guide Say a Little Prayer (1992)
 Say a Little Prayer press kit

1993 films
Australian drama films
Films set in Australia
1993 drama films
1990s English-language films
Films directed by Richard Lowenstein
1990s Australian films